Robert Smith (born August 20, 1973 in Wilmington, Delaware) is a former U.S. soccer player.  He spent five seasons with the Columbus Crew of Major League Soccer as a midfielder.  He was also a member of the U.S. soccer team at the 1996 Summer Olympics.

Player

Youth
Rob Smith played for Kirkwood Soccer Club in New Castle Delaware for many of his youth years.

Rob Smith played for Thomas McKean High school in Wilmington, DE before attending the University of South Carolina where he played on the men's soccer team from 1991 to 1994.  He holds the school's career assists record with 40.

Professional
In 1995, Smith played eleven games with the Delaware Wizards of USISL.  The Columbus Crew selected Smith in the second round (20th overall) in the 1996 MLS Supplemental Draft.  He spent five seasons with the Crew.  Smith announced his retirement from playing on May 5, 2000. He played one game with the Indiana Blast.  He then signed with the Charleston Battery on August 2, 2000, for the remainder of the 2000 USL season.  He never played a game for the Battery.

National teams
In 1993, Smith was selected for the U.S. team which qualified for the 1993 U-20 World Cup to be held in Australia.  At the World Cup, the U.S. went 1-1-1 in group play, qualifying for the second round where it fell to Brazil.  Smith started all four games and assisted on two U.S. goals. In 1995, Smith was part of the U.S. soccer team at the Pan American games.  The U.S. lost all three of its first-round games and did not qualify for the second round.  That year, he also played on the U.S. World University Games soccer team. In 1996, U.S. coach Bruce Arena named Smith to the U.S. soccer team at the 1996 Summer Olympics.  The team went 1-1-1, but failed to make the second round.

Coaching
Since retiring from playing professionally, Smith has held several youth soccer positions beginning with Learning Through Sports, an organization he founded in 1996.  In 2001, he joined the Worthington United Soccer Club and the Ohio South Olympic Development Program and continued with them both through 2003.  In 2004, he joined WASA Eagles FC as the Director of Player Development.  He also spent two seasons as an assistant coach with the University of South Carolina.

Besides coaching youth soccer, Smith is the Gym teacher at Worthington Hills Elementary School.

He taught badminton courses at Ohio State University in 2006-2007.

He also taught a gym class at Calumet Christian School in Columbus, Ohio, for elementary and middle school students from 2002 to 2006.

References

External links
 Rob Smith personal page

1973 births
Columbus Crew players
Delaware Wizards players
Footballers at the 1996 Summer Olympics
Indiana Blast players
Living people
Major League Soccer players
Olympic soccer players of the United States
USISL Select League players
A-League (1995–2004) players
Soccer players from Delaware
Sportspeople from Wilmington, Delaware
United States men's under-20 international soccer players
Pan American Games competitors for the United States
Footballers at the 1995 Pan American Games
Columbus Crew draft picks
American soccer players
Association football midfielders